Kopano Matlwa (born 1985) is a South African writer and doctor, known for her novel Spilt Milk, which focuses on the South Africa's "Born Free" generation, and Coconut, her debut novel, which addresses issues of race, class, and colonization in modern Johannesburg. Coconut was awarded the European Union Literary Award in 2006/2007 and also won the Wole Soyinka Prize for Literature in Africa in 2010. Spilt Milk was on the longlist for the 2011 Sunday Times Fiction Prize.

Early life 
Kopano Matlwa Mabaso (née Matlwa) was born in a township outside of Pretoria, South Africa. She began writing in 2004 when HIV was devastating South Africa, later saying, "Writing was debriefing for myself, trying to make sense of all the crazy things I would see."

Education 
Mabaso received her medical degree from the University of Cape Town and then completed her Masters in Global Health Science and Doctorate (PhD) in Population Health from Oxford University, where she was granted a Rhodes Scholarship.

Career 
Matlwa was nine or 10 years old in 1994 when Nelson Mandela was elected president of South Africa, and she told NPR that she remembers it as an "exciting time": "We were the 'Rainbow Nation,' and kind of the 'golden children' of Africa." As she grew up, however, Matlwa says that the sense of hope and newness fell away to the reality of a corruptible government. She is also a Rhodes Scholar and physician, who wrote her first novel, Coconut, while completing her medical degree. Matlwa has been cited as the emerging voice of a new generation of South African writers, dealing with issues such as race, poverty and gender. Coconut has been noted for its exploration of women's appearance, including the political aspect of black women's hair.

While still in medical school at the University of Cape Town, Matlwa co-founded the Waiting Room Education by Medical Students (WREM). This service educates patients and their families on common health conditions in the waiting rooms of mobile clinics. Her non-literary honours include: Young Physician Leader by the Interacademies Medial Panel in 2014, 2015 class of Tutu Fellows and Aspen Institute's New Voices in Global Health Fellow. Ona-Mtoto-Wako, an initiative to bring antenatal health care to pregnant women living in remote and rural parts of the developing world that she co-founded with her friend Chrystelle Wedi, won the 2015 Aspen Idea Award.

Matlwa is the executive director of Grow Great, a campaign aimed at mobilizing South Africa towards achieving a stunting-free generation by 2030. Stunting is a medical condition where a child has impaired growth and development as a result of "poor nutrition, repeated infection, and inadequate psychosocial stimulation." Matlwa is also the founder of the Transitions Foundation, an organization that seeks to help South Africa's youth transition from hopelessness to personal fulfilment through education.

Books

Coconut 
Coconut is set in post-apartheid South Africa and is built around the concept of the 'coconut', which is a person "who is black but who speaks like a white person". It delves into the complex society that was supposed to be free but "as new freedoms are born with difficulty, [they] often reveal fresh problems or create them." The novel is divided into two narratives: Fifi, who is a member of the black middle class, and Fiks, a poor black orphan. Both of these protagonists struggle with finding their identity in the new multiracial society; they experience the divide between various African ideals and global Western values of whiteness.

Spilt Milk 
Spilt Milk focuses on the South Africa's "Born Free" generation, or those who became adults in the post-Apartheid era. The novel’s protagonist is Mohumagadi, a black principal of her own successful school. The novel explores the relationship between Mohumagadi and her students and also the relationship between Mohumagadi and a white priest who is living through hard times. While writing this novel, Matlwa felt disappointed with the new post-Apartheid era politics and with personal feelings; it wasn’t everything that was promised. The characters in the novel and their interactions with one another are representative of the feelings of disappointment that the South African “born free” generation experienced. They soon found "deceit and greed and corruption creeping into society."

Period Pain 
In 2016, Matlwa published her third novel, Period Pain. This novel discusses how South Africans discriminate against foreign nations and how “xenophobia exists within households and institutions." It follows Masechaba’s story as she grows up in South Africa, dealing with how South Africans are perceived by other Africans as enslaved and spoiled. Through her struggles and marked events in her life, we are given a look into the mental health challenges that not only affect patients but also the professionals who deal with the patients. Matlwa’s Period Pain was shortlisted for the 2017 Sunday Times Barry Ronge Fiction Prize, the South African Literary Awards, and South Africa’s Humanities and Social Sciences Award.

Works 
Coconut (Jacana, 2007), 
Spilt Milk (Jacana, 2010), 
Period Pain (Jacana, 2017), . As Evening Primrose (London: Sceptre, 2017),

Awards 

 2007 European Literary Award (for her novel Coconut)
 2010 Wole Soyinka Prize for Literature in Africa (joint winner for her novel Coconut)
 2014 Young Physician Leader (selected by the Interacademies Media Panel)
 2015 Aspen Idea Award
 2015 Tutu Fellowship
 2015 Aspen New Voices Fellow

References

External links
 Kopano Matlwa page at Pontas Agency.
 "What to do when a moonshot falls short" TEDxJohannesburg

South African women novelists
Living people
1985 births
21st-century South African novelists
21st-century South African women writers
South African writers